"Stanky Legg" is a song by American hip hop trio GS Boyz, released on August 15, 2008 as their commercial debut single. The trio performed the single at BET's annual fashion show Rip the Runway.

Music video
The music video for the song was directed by Kai Crawford and released in February 2009. It went on to reach the number-one spot on the urban music countdown TV series 106 & Park and received moderate play on MTV Jams. It ranked at #26 on BET's Notarized Top 100 Videos of 2009 countdown.

Stanky Legg dance
The "Stanky Legg" is a multi-step dance that involves the circular movement of the dancer's leg, with an alternation between legs. The dance also contains elements of dances such as the "Booty Dew" and the "Dougie".

Notable instances
At the 2009 FIFA Confederations Cup, U.S. forwards Jozy Altidore and Charlie Davies used this dance as their goal celebration, making it a popular reference in the U.S. Soccer scene. During Super Bowl LVII, Travis Kelce caught the football, scored a touchdown, and immediately celebrated with the dance.

Charts

Weekly charts

Year-end charts

References

2008 songs
2008 debut singles
GS Boyz songs
Hip hop dance
Songs about dancing
Novelty and fad dances
Street dance